"We'll Find Our Day" is a popular song written by Roger Holman and Simon May. It was recorded by Stephanie De-Sykes for her self-titled 1975 album. The single peaked at number 17 in the United Kingdom.

Charts

References

1975 songs
1975 singles